The Cats is a 1965 Swedish drama film directed by Henning Carlsen. Eva Dahlbeck received the award for Best Actress at the 2nd Guldbagge Awards.

Cast
 Eva Dahlbeck as Marta Alleus
 Gio Petré as Rike
 Monica Nielsen as Mirka
 Per Myrberg as Johnny
 Lena Granhagen as Ragni
 Hjördis Petterson as Anna
 Isa Quensel as Tora
 Ruth Kasdan as Xenia
 Inga Gill as Klara
 Lena Hansson as Sally

References

External links
 
 

1965 films
1965 drama films
Swedish drama films
1960s Swedish-language films
Swedish black-and-white films
Films directed by Henning Carlsen
Films scored by Krzysztof Komeda
1960s Swedish films